The Israel women's national lacrosse team represents Israel at women's field lacrosse events. It is governed by the Israel Lacrosse Association.

Women's Lacrosse World Cup

Israel has competed at the Women's Lacrosse World Cup since 2013. In 2013, Israel finished in 8th place. Prior to 2013, Israel was unable to compete due to the Israel Lacrosse Association not being officially recognized by the Federation of International Lacrosse until April 2011.

Record

2013 Women's Lacrosse World Cup
During the 2013 Tournament, Israel entered for the first time, finishing in 8th place. Tryouts for the Israeli team were held at Yarkon Sports Complex in Tel Aviv and Peddie School in Hightstown, NJ.

Israel was led by coach Lauren Paul Norris, who made her debut as a coach in an international competition. The team consisted of both Israelis and Jews from around the world. Any Jew, due to being eligible for Israeli citizenship under the law of return may play for Israel in the tournament, based on the rules from the Federation of International Lacrosse.

Israel, was scheduled to face Haudenosaunee to determine the 7th place finish on 20 July. Israel however chose to forfeit the game because it fell on Shabbat. The decision to forfeit rather than play is consistent to the policy of the Israel Lacrosse Association.

Israeli Katie Mazer was one of the recipients of the Heart of Lacrosse award.

Standings

Results

Round 1 (17 July)
 (10) Israel  12–9  New Zealand (7)

Quarterfinals (18 July)
 (2) Canada  17–5  Israel (10)

5th-8th Place (19 July)
 (11) Scotland  9–7  Israel (10)

7th Place Match (20 July)
 (8) Haudenosaunee  1–0*  Israel (10) (Israel forfeited.)

Source:

Team
Coach: Lauren Paul NorrisAssistant coach: Peter Friedensohn, Laura Liebman

Forwards
 Nikki Avershal
Jenna Block
Samantha Ellis
Molly Mulligan
Nicole Sawdaye
Ifat Ribon
Amanda Schwab

Midfields
Alison Curwin
Kimberly Dubansky
Lauren Dykstra
Sara Greenberg
Talia Hillman
Rachael Levy
Sarah Meisenberg
Elyssa Rosenbaum
Stephanie Tenenbaum

Defense
Katie Mazer
Taylor Pedersen
Alicia Perry

Goal
Julia Szafman

Source:

2017 Women's Lacrosse World Cup
Israel has qualified for the 2017 Women's Lacrosse World Cup, with coach Lauren Paul Norris returning.

Israel held try outs in July 2016 for the team, which included both Israelis and any Jew located outside of Israel. Based on international competition rules, any player eligible for citizenship of a country, whether they have it or not, may compete for that country.

Women's European Lacrosse Championships

Israel has competed at the Women's European Lacrosse Championships since 2015 where they finished 4th. Prior to 2015, Israel was unable to compete due to the Israel Lacrosse Association not being officially recognized by the Federation of International Lacrosse until April 2011.

Record

2015 Women's Lacrosse European Championship
During the 2015 Championship, Israel competed for the first time, and finished in 4th place. Although Israel at the Women's Lacrosse World Cup utilizes both Israel and non-Israeli Jewish players, the 2015 European Championship team was made up of only Israeli players.

Standings

Results

Bracket

Quarterfinals

Semifinals

3rd place game

Team

Source:

References

External links

National lacrosse teams
Lacrosse
Women's lacrosse in Israel
Women's lacrosse teams